So You Think You Can Dance Scandinavia was an entry in the international So You Think You Can Dance franchise of dance competition television shows which represented Denmark, Norway, and Sweden.

Previous to the launch of the show, Denmark and Norway each had their own individual So You Think You Can Dance shows (Kan Du Danse? and Dansefeber, respectively) which aired on channels Kanal 5 of Denmark and TVNorge of Norway.   Both networks belonged to media conglomerate ProSiebenSat.1 Media and, following a run of two seasons for both shows, a decision was made to combine them into one series that would be broadcast in (and allow contestants from) both countries as well as Sweden.  Swedish station Kanal 5 (also owned by ProSiebenSat.1) took on the bulk of the production for the new show and aired it in Sweden with TVNorge and Kanal 5 (of Denmark) continuing as the broadcasters in their regions.  This combined series was discontinued after one season, ending the run of So You Think You Can Dance in Scandinavia.

The first and only winner of  So You Think You Can Dance Scandinavia was Mona Berntsen, a dancer who had fared well in Dansefeber in 2007, progressing to that show's top 12 before an injury forced her to withdraw.  Berntsen was told that she could audition for next season of Dansefeber, and when that show was combined to make So You Think You Can Dance Scandinavia, she was extended an invitation to participate.  As the winner of the new series, she won 500.000 NOK and the title "Scandinavia's Favourite Dancer". First runner-up was Martin Gæbe, 3rd place-finalist was Daniel Koivunen, and Mynte Lagoni took 4th place.

Hosts
Henriette Lien (Norway)
Vicki Jo (Denmark)
Kicki Berg (Sweden)

Judges
Merete Lingjærde (Norway)
Niclas Bendixen (Denmark)
Fredrik "Benke" Rydman (Sweden)
Mary Murphy (guest judge, US)

Auditions
The minimum age for audition was 16 years, and those who got through would advance to the show's main headquarters in Oslo. Contestants must use music from the industry's Big Four labels – Universal Music Group, EMI, Warner Music Group or Sony BMG. The auditions were held in Oslo (Norway), Copenhagen (Denmark) and Stockholm (Sweden).

Workshop
After the auditions in Norway, Denmark and Sweden the show had a big workshop in Oslo.

There they found 8 dancers from each country. 4 males and 4 females each. The workshop included (with eliminations after each performance):

Finals

Format
The finals began with 24 contestants, 4 males and 4 females from each country. After partners are assigned, couples pick a dance style out of a hat, have a rehearsal with a choreographer, and perform their routine. Following the airing performances, home viewers vote for their favorite couple. The bottom three couples (six dancers overall) are then liable for elimination by the judges on the result shows an hour later. All six dancers perform a solo, after which the judges eliminate one male and one female contestant (the first two shows they eliminate four dancers). If the eliminated dancers are not from the same couple, their respective partners form a new pair for the following week's performances. Once the field of dancers is narrowed down to the top 12, permanent partnerships dissolve and contestants draw their new partners and two dance styles from a hat each week. The judges no longer have any say in the elimination process; viewers call in to vote for their favorite individual dancer, and the male and the female with the lowest votes are eliminated each week.

Top 24 finalists

Male contestants

Female contestants

Elimination chart
Contestants are in chronogical order of elimination.

Performances

Week 1 (10 April 2008)
 Couple dances:

 Group dance: Contestants next show (week 2): "Freakshow"—Britney Spears (Jazz; Choreographer: Tine Aspaas)
 Bottom 3's solos:

 Eliminated:
 Stinna Shaktiva
 Andrea Schirmer
 Yngvar Halvorsen
 Mario Amigo
 New partners:
 Huyen Huynh and Marvin Spahi

Week 2 (17 April 2008)
 Couple dances:

 Group dance: Contestants past show that got thru: "So Much Betta"—Janet Jackson feat. Daft Punk (Hip-Hop; Choreographer: Belinda Braza)
 Bottom 3's solos:

 Eliminated:
 Suzi Asovic
 Anete Jensen
 Geir Gundersen
 Phillip Jenkins
 New partners:
 Sandra Vather and Daniel Sarr

Week 3 (24 April 2008)
 Couple dances:

 Group dance: Top 16: "Big Spender"—Shirley Bassey (Broadway; Choreographer: Roine Söderlundh)
 Bottom 3's solos:

 Eliminated:
 Sandra Vather
 Daniel Sarr
 New partners:
 None

Week 4 (1 May 2008)
 Couple dances:

 Group dance: Top 14: "Charlie Big Potato"—Skunk Anansie (Jazz; Choreographer: Kristine Melby)
 Bottom 3's solos:

 Eliminated:
 Marie Sol Sandberg
 Marvin Spahi
 New partners:
 Every couple. Now that only the top 12 remain, new partners are randomly assigned each week.

Week 5 (8 May 2008)
 Couple dances:

 Bottom 6's solos:

 Eliminated:
 Huyen Huynh
 Egor Filipenko

Week 6 (15 May 2008)
 Couple dances:

 Bottom 6's solos:

 Eliminated:
 Trinh Nguyen
 Robin Peters

Week 7 (22 May 2008)
 Couple dances:

 Bottom 6's solos:

 Eliminated:
 Siv Gaustad
 Ronni Morgenstjerne

Week 8 – Finale (29 May 2008)
Judges: Mary Murphy, Fredrik "Benke" Rydman, Merete Lingjærde and Niclas Bendixen
 Group dances:

 Couple dances:

 Winner of "best move"-competition on internet:
 Mario Amigo (received 50.000 SEK)
 Top 6:
 Sergio Junior
 Emma Hedlund
 Top 4's solos:

 Top 4:
 Mynte Lagoni (4th place)
 Daniel Kouvinen (3rd place)
 Runner-up:
 Martin Gæbe
 WINNER:
 Mona Berntsen

See also
Dance on television

References

External links
 So You Think You Can Dance Scandinavia on TVNorge.no

So You Think You Can Dance
Norwegian reality television series
Swedish reality television series
Danish reality television series
TVNorge original programming
2008 Norwegian television series debuts
2008 Danish television series debuts
2008 Swedish television series debuts
2008 Norwegian television series endings
2008 Danish television series endings
2008 Swedish television series endings
2000s Norwegian television series
2000s Danish television series
2000s Swedish television series
Non-American television series based on American television series
Danish television series based on American television series
Norwegian television series based on American television series
Swedish television series based on American television series
Kanal 5 (Danish TV channel) original programming
Kanal 5 (Swedish TV channel) original programming